Jonas Björkman and Todd Woodbridge were the defending champions but lost in the final 6–2, 6–4 against Mahesh Bhupathi and Jan-Michael Gambill.

Seeds
Champion seeds are indicated in bold text while text in italics indicates the round in which those seeds were eliminated.

Draw

Final

Top half

Bottom half

External links
 2002 Hamburg Masters Doubles draw

2002 ATP Tour